John Joseph Mizerock (born December 8, 1960) is a former Major League Baseball backup catcher for the Houston Astros and the Atlanta Braves. He was the eighth overall pick in the 1979 Major League Baseball Draft. He later served as a coach for the Kansas City Royals and Philadelphia Phillies. He is currently the hitting coach for the Clearwater Threshers.

Houston Astros
The Houston Astros drafted eighteen-year-old Mizerock straight out of Punxsutawney High School in Punxsutawney, Pennsylvania. He was the second of five catchers selected in the first round of the June  draft. After four seasons in their farm system, in which he batted .228 with eighteen home runs (twelve of which were hit in ) and 143 runs batted in, Mizerock made the Astros out of Spring training  as Alan Ashby's back-up. He allowed three passed balls in a game against the Cincinnati Reds on April 19 to not only lose the back-up catcher job, but to also get himself sent back down to the minors. In fairness to Mizerock, knuckleballer Joe Niekro was pitching.

After Ashby was lost for a month of the season with a viral infection in his ear, Mizerock was called back up. However, he only appeared in four games during that span, and was optioned back down to the triple A Tucson Toros upon Ashby's return. He was brought back up for a third time in mid-August, and remained on the major league roster through the end of the season. He had a second game with Niekro on the mound on August 31 in which he had two passed balls. In all, Mizerock had eleven passed balls for the season; eight of which occurred with Niekro pitching.

After spending all of the  season with the double A Columbus Astros, he returned to Houston late in the  season to fill in for an injured Ashby. He was with the Astros on and off throughout their division winning  season, and was on their post-season roster, but did not make an appearance in the 1986 National League Championship Series against the New York Mets. He was released after the season.

Atlanta Braves
Mizerock spent spring training  with the Montreal Expos, but failed to make the club. Just as the season was set to begin, he signed with the Atlanta Braves. He batted .222 with two RBIs in eleven games. After one more season in the Braves' minor league system, Mizerock retired.

Coaching
Since retiring as a player, Mizerock has served as a minor league manager, a coach and interim manager with the Kansas City Royals. He is a two time winner of the Dick Howser Award, awarded for outstanding contributions to the Royals organization ( and ).

In 1996, Wilmington won the league championship with Mizerock at the helm. He compiled 646 wins and 554 losses in his minor league managerial career.

Mizerock was promoted from bullpen coach to interim manager of the Royals 23 games into the season when Tony Muser was fired. His first game managing was against the Detroit Tigers, who were being managed by Luis Pujols on an interim basis. Pujols and Mizerock were teammates on the 1983 Houston Astros, competing for the back-up catcher job.

After losing their first six games under Mizerock, the Royals won five of their next seven before he was replaced by Tony Peña. In all, he led his team to a 5–8 record in thirteen games. 2002 was the first time in franchise history that Kansas City had lost 100 games. He accepted a position to once again manage the high level Class A Wilmington Blue Rocks minor league team for the 2007 season. With his leadership, the team led the Carolina League in winning percentage, and returned to the playoffs.

On October 23, 2007, Mizerock was named the Royals' bullpen coach for the 2008 season. His contract was not renewed following the  season.

He became the assistant hitting coach of the Philadelphia Phillies on December 18, 2013, and later became their third base coach. Mizerock was not retained by the Phillies following the 2015 season. He later accepted a position as a coach for Philadelphia's Short Season-A team, the Williamsport Crosscutters for the 2016 season. Mizerock was named as the pitching coach for the Clearwater Threshers of the 2018 season.

References

External links

1960 births
Living people
Atlanta Braves players
Baseball players from Pennsylvania
Columbus Astros players
Daytona Beach Astros players
Greenville Braves players
Houston Astros players
Kansas City Royals coaches
Kansas City Royals managers
Major League Baseball bullpen coaches
Major League Baseball catchers
Major League Baseball hitting coaches
Major League Baseball third base coaches
Minor league baseball managers
People from Punxsutawney, Pennsylvania
Philadelphia Phillies coaches
Richmond Braves players
Tucson Toros players
Minor league baseball coaches